Agyneta amersaxatilis is a species of sheet weaver spider found in Russia, Canada, Alaska, and the continental United States. It was described by Saaristo & Koponen in 1998.

References

amersaxatilis
Spiders described in 1998
Spiders of North America
Spiders of Russia